Percy Reginald Dix (17 November 1866 – 13 March 1917) was a New Zealand tea merchant and vaudeville company manager. He was born in Launceston, Tasmania, Australia on 17 November 1866.

References

1866 births
1917 deaths
Australian emigrants to New Zealand
New Zealand traders
People from Launceston, Tasmania